Tvashtr or Tvashta is a Vedic artisan god or fashioner. He is mentioned as an Aditya (sons of goddess Aditi) in later Hindu scriptures like the Mahabharata and Puranas, though his significance gets reduced. Tvashtr is sometimes identified with another artisan deity named Vishvakarma.

In Hindu Literature
In the Rigveda, Tvashtr is stated to be a skillful craftsman who created many implements, including Indra's bolt, the axe of Brihaspati, and a cup for divine food and drink. He is stated to be the creator of forms, and is often stated to be the crafter of living beings and wombs.  He is also considered a universal father, and an ancestor of humans through his daughter Saranyu. He is the father of Bṛhaspati, and likely Indra's father as well. He wields a metal axe, and rides a chariot pulled by two fallow bay mares. 

He is the guardian of Soma, and his son Vishvarupa is the guardian of cows. Indra has a conflict with his likely father Tvashtr, with him stealing Tvashtr's soma and trying to possess Vishvarupa’s cattle. Indra is consistently victorious in the conflict, and Tvashtr is stated to fear Indra. In the Taittiriya Samhita and Brahmanas, Vishvarupa is killed by Indra, and so Tvashtr does not allow Indra to attend his Soma sacrifice. Indra however, steals and drinks the soma through his strength. In order to have revenge for the murder of his son Vishvarupa, Tvashtr creates a demon called Vritra. However when wishing him into existence, Tvashtr makes a mispronunciation in his incantation, which allows Indra to defeat Vritra. In the Mānava Purana, he took rebirth as Arjuna's son,  Babhruvahana.

Tvashtr is associated with many other deities, Pushan, Savitr, Dhatr, Prajapati, and Vishvakarman, due to his role as a fashioner.

See also
 Tuisto

Citations

External links
www.viswakarmas.com

Hindu gods
Rigvedic deities
Solar gods
Smithing gods